Cobham Park, or Cobham Park Estate, is a historic estate located near Cobham, in Albemarle County and Louisa County, Virginia. The mansion was built in 1856, and is a rectangular -story, five bay, double pile structure covered by a hipped roof with three hipped roof dormers on each of the main slopes, and one dormer on each end. The house is an unusual example of ante-bellum period Georgian style architecture.  It features front and rear, simple Doric order porches supported on square Ionic order columns.  Also on the property are: two smokehouses, one brick and one frame, a frame dependency, and a simple two-story
frame dwelling.  It was the summer home of William Cabell Rives, Jr., (1825-1890), second son of the noted United States senator and minister to France William Cabell Rives.

It was added to the National Register of Historic Places in 1974.

References

Houses on the National Register of Historic Places in Virginia
Georgian architecture in Virginia
Houses completed in 1856
Houses in Albemarle County, Virginia
Houses in Louisa County, Virginia
National Register of Historic Places in Albemarle County, Virginia
National Register of Historic Places in Louisa County, Virginia